Docostoma is a genus of moths in the family Blastobasidae. It contains the single species Docostoma insignis, which is found in New Guinea.

References

Blastobasidae genera
Monotypic moth genera
Moths of Oceania